Screen door may refer to:

screen door, a type of door
Screen Door, a Canadian independent production company 
 Screen Door (restaurant), a Southern and soul food restaurant in Portland, Oregon
Screen door effect, a fixed-pattern noise (FPN) or a visual artifact of certain digital video projectors and CRT televisions
Platform screen doors in rail stations